William Henry Schofield (1870–1920) was an American academic, founder of the Harvard Studies in Comparative Literature. He was professor of comparative literature at Harvard University, and president of the American-Scandinavian Foundation (1916–1919).

He taught Old Norse at Harvard from 1900 and from 1906 was director of the new Comparative Literature department.

Victoria College, B.A. 1889; Harvard University PhD 1895; Professor of Comparative Literature Harvard University, 1906–20; Harvard Exchange Professor at University of Berlin, 1907; Lecturer at the Sorbonne and University of Copenhagen, 1910. Harvard Exchange Professor at Western Colleges, 1918.  Information taken from a bookplate from  Victoria University Library (Toronto, Ontario, Canada); book purchased from The Schofield Fund in memory of William Henry Schofield. Accession date: Jan. 27, 1937. [Title : The Blickling homilies]

Works
Some of the best known are volume II in Harvard Studies in Comparative Literature, Chivalry in English Literature, published 1912 and on Chaucer, Malory, Spenser and Shakespeare, and volume V in the same series, Mythical Bards and The Life of William Wallace published 1920, about Blind Harry, Major's evidence, Master Blair and William Wallace. Both were published by the Harvard University Press.

The Studies on the Libeaus Desconus (1895) was later used to track Malory's sources. In this work on the Libeaus Desconus, Schofield argued that the original of the Fair Unknown theme was Perceval.

The source and history of the seventh novel of the seventh day in the Decameron (1893)
Studies on the Libeaus Desconus (1895)
The lay of Guingamor (1897)
The Home of the Eddic Poems with Especial Reference to the Helgi-Lays by Sophus Bugge (1899) translator
The lays of Graelent and Lanval and the story of Wayland (1900)
Ibsen's Masterbuilder (1900)
Chaucer's Franklin's tales (1901)
Signy's lament (1902)
The story of Horn and Rimenhild (1903)
The nature and fabric of the Pearl (1904)
English literature : from the Norman conquest to Chaucer (1906)
Symbolism, allegory, and autobiography in the Pearl (1909)
Romance, vision & satire : English alliterative poems of the 14th century (1912) with Jessie Weston
Chivalry in English literature : Chaucer, Malory, Spenser, and Shakespeare (1912)
The sea-battle in Chaucer's Legend of Cleopatra (1913)
The chief historical error in Barbour's Bruce (1916)
An American international institute for education (1918)
Mythical bards and The life of William Wallace (1920)

References

External links
 

1870 births
1920 deaths
Harvard University alumni
Harvard University faculty